1177 Gonnessia, provisional designation , is a dark background asteroid from the outer regions of the asteroid belt, approximately 99 kilometers in diameter. It was discovered on 24 November 1930, by French astronomer Louis Boyer at the Algiers Observatory in Algeria, North Africa, and named after astronomer François Gonnessiat.

Orbit and classification 

Gonnessia is not a member of any known asteroid family. It orbits the Sun in the outer main-belt at a distance of 3.2–3.5 AU once every 6 years and 2 months (2,238 days). Its orbit has an eccentricity of 0.03 and an inclination of 15° with respect to the ecliptic.

The body's observation arc begins at Heidelberg Observatory, three weeks after its official discovery observation at Algiers Bouzaréah.

Physical characteristics 

In the Tholen classification, Gonnessia is classified as an asteroid with an unusual spectrum (XFU). It was also characterized as an X-type asteroid by PanSTARRS photometric survey.

Lightcurve photometry 

Several rotational lightcurves of Gonnessia were obtained since 2002. The best rated photometric observations were taken in 2010, by American astronomer Robert Stephens at the Goat Mountain Astronomical Research Station and Santana Observatory in California. Lightcurve analysis gave a rotation period of 30.51 hours with a brightness amplitude of 0.10 magnitude, indicative for a spheroidal shape. Previous observations by Brian Warner gave a longer period of 82 hours based on sparse photometry. While not being a slow rotator, Gonnessia has a notably slower spin rate than most asteroids.

Diameter and albedo 

According to the surveys carried out by the Infrared Astronomical Satellite IRAS, the Japanese Akari satellite and the NEOWISE mission of NASA's Wide-field Infrared Survey Explorer, Gonnessia measures between 91.98 and 104.63 kilometers in diameter  and its surface has an albedo between 0.03 and 0.040.

The Collaborative Asteroid Lightcurve Link adopts the results obtained by IRAS, that is an albedo of 0.0398 with a diameter of 91.98 kilometers. It also takes Petr Pravec's revised absolute magnitude from WISE of 9.24.

Naming 

This minor planet was named after astronomer François Gonnessiat (1856–1934), who was an observer of comets and a discoverer of minor planets. Gonnessiat was also a director of the discovering Algiers Observatory and headed the Quito Astronomical Observatory in Ecuador as well. The official naming citation was mentioned in The Names of the Minor Planets by Paul Herget in 1955.

Notes

References

External links 
 Asteroid Lightcurve Database (LCDB), query form (info )
 Dictionary of Minor Planet Names, Google books
 Asteroids and comets rotation curves, CdR – Observatoire de Genève, Raoul Behrend
 Discovery Circumstances: Numbered Minor Planets (1)-(5000) – Minor Planet Center
 
 

001177
Discoveries by Louis Boyer (astronomer)
Named minor planets
001177
19301124